4464 may refer to:

 4-4-6-4, a Whyte notation classification of steam locomotive
 4464 Vulcano, a minor planet